The following is a list of the fourteen reservoirs, in the United States state of Wyoming, that contain at least  when at full capacity. In addition to in-stream reservoirs, the list includes enhanced natural lakes, notably Jackson Lake. With five of the fourteen largest reservoirs in the state, the North Platte River is the most dammed river in the state, and provides much of the state's water storage.

These reservoirs provide  of storage. (Some of this storage capacity, or of the water held in it, is allocated otherwise than for normal use within the state.)

List

See also
List of dams and reservoirs in Wyoming
List of largest reservoirs in the United States
List of rivers in Wyoming
List of lakes in Wyoming

Notes

References

Reservoirs in Wyoming
Colorado River Storage Project
United States Bureau of Reclamation dams